BTTB is a 1999 piano solo and duet album by Ryuichi Sakamoto. The album title is an acronym for "Back To The Basics". Two separate versions of the album were pressed, for Japanese and international markets. The International version opens with the three songs off of the ウラBTTB maxi single released in Japan as a promotional tool, while replacing a few pieces elsewhere in the album. The maxi single peaked at number four on the Japanese singles chart.

Track listing

Personnel
 Ryuichi Sakamoto – piano, production
 Fernando Aponte – engineer
 Naoto Shibuya – engineer, mixing
 Masaki Sekiguchi – assistant engineer
 Ted Jensen – mastering
 Hideki Nakajima – direction

References

1999 albums
Ryuichi Sakamoto albums
Albums produced by Ryuichi Sakamoto